Leland College was founded in 1870 as a college for blacks in New Orleans, Louisiana, but was open to all races. After its original buildings burned in 1923, it was relocated near Baker, Louisiana. Never accredited, the school closed in 1960 because of financial difficulties.

The  area of the Baker campus, comprising four contributing properties and one non-contributing building, was listed on the National Register of Historic Places on November 10, 1982.

The college facilities had become derelict by the time of listing. In the early 21st century, only the ruins of the two dormitories can be seen faintly through trees. Frame classroom, the President's House, and the Concrete Classrom all disappeared at some time.

Holbrook Chamberlain, a philanthropist from Brooklyn established the school. He bought the land and built the school buildings. John Elijah Ford served as the school’s president.

Notable alumnus
 Eddie Robinson - former Grambling State University head football coach - Class Year 1941
 John W. Joseph - first black mayor of Opelousas, Louisiana
 Professor Eugene A. Daule (Doley)
 Rev A. L. Davis - 1949

See also
National Register of Historic Places listings in East Baton Rouge Parish, Louisiana

References

Defunct private universities and colleges in Louisiana
Universities and colleges in New Orleans
University and college buildings on the National Register of Historic Places in Louisiana
Buildings and structures in East Baton Rouge Parish, Louisiana
National Register of Historic Places in East Baton Rouge Parish, Louisiana
1870 establishments in Louisiana
1960 disestablishments in Louisiana
Historically black universities and colleges in Louisiana